Sidney Gardiner (July 23, 1787 - May 1827) was a prominent American silversmith and merchant, active in Boston and Philadelphia. His firm of Fletcher & Gardiner was nationally renowned.

Fletcher was born in Mattituck, New York. He migrated to Boston, where his family had long-standing connections. In 1803 he and Thomas Fletcher, then in their teens, formed a partnership that comprised silversmithing and selling fancy hardware at 43 Marlboro Street. In 1811 their firm of Fletcher & Gardiner moved to Philadelphia, with a shop at Third and Chestnut Street, where Gardiner worked until his death while traveling in Vera Cruz, Mexico. In 1824 he was a founding member of the Franklin Institute.

Silver by Fletcher & Gardiner is collected in the Metropolitan Museum of Art, the Harvard Art Museums, Winterthur Museum, and Yale University Art Gallery. His papers are archived in the Winterthur Museum.

References 
 "Sidney Gardiner", American Silversmiths.
 Silversmiths to The Nation: Thomas Fletcher & Sidney Gardiner, 1808-1842, Donald L. Fennimore & Ann K. Wagner, Antique Collectors' Club, 2007.
 "Fletcher & Gardiner", The Grove Encyclopedia of Decorative Arts.

American silversmiths
1787 births
1827 deaths